A Further Gesture is a 1997 film directed by Robert Dornhelm. It stars Stephen Rea and Alfred Molina and had its première at the 12th Dublin Film Festival on 4 March 1997. It is also known as The Break.

Cast
Stephen Rea as Sean Dowd
Alfred Molina as Tulio
Rosana Pastor as Monica
Brendan Gleeson as Richard
Jorge Sanz as Paco

References

External links

1997 films
British romantic thriller films
Films directed by Robert Dornhelm
Films set in the United States
1990s English-language films
1990s British films